Honeymoon Lodge, also known as Second Honeymoon, is a 1943 American  musical comedy film directed by Edward C. Lilley for Universal Pictures and starring David Bruce, Harriet Hilliard, June Vincent, and Rod Cameron.

Plot

Cast
David Bruce as Horace Crump / Bob Sterling
Harriet Hilliard as Lorraine Logan / Jenny Hockadayl
June Vincent as Carol Sterling Crump
Rod Cameron as Big Boy Carson
Franklin Pangborn as Cathcart
Andrew Tombes as Judge Wilkins
Martin Ashe as George Thomas
Ozzie Nelson as himself, the Band Leader
Veloz and Yolanda as dancers
Tip, Tap and Toe as the Speciality Act
Bobby Brooks as himself 	
Hattie Noel as herself 	... 	
Ray Eberle as himself, the Band Singer
Joseph Crehan as the Judge

References

External links

1943 films
American musical comedy films
1943 musical comedy films
Universal Pictures films
American black-and-white films
Films directed by Edward C. Lilley
1940s American films